Paul the Jew was the Patriarch of Antioch, and head of the Greek Orthodox Church of Antioch, from 519 to 521.

Biography
Paul was born in Constantinople, where he became a priest and chief administrator of the Hospice of Euboulos. Paul was consecrated Patriarch of Antioch by the end of June 519. He was consecrated in Antioch on the insistence of Pope Hormisdas, despite initial plans to consecrate Paul in Constantinople. The Church of Antioch suffered from a lack of funds at this time, and thus Emperor Justin I bestowed upon Paul a large amount of money for the maintenance of the Church.

After his ascension to the throne, Emperor Justin ordered bishops within the Diocese of the East to accept the Council of Chalcedon or face deposition. In November 519, with the aid of the imperial army, the patriarch had Paul, Bishop of Edessa, who had refused to accept the council, forcibly removed from his church, despite the protestations of the local population, and exiled to Seleucia in Syria. Fearing civil unrest, Emperor Justin restored Paul to the see of Edessa after forty days. According to John of Ephesus, Paul carried out assassinations and torture during his tenure as patriarch.

Paul's persecution towards non-Chalcedonians earned him the cognomen, "the Jew". He ordered non-Chalcedonian monks on the fringe of the Syrian Desert to sign a declaration of acceptance of the Council of Chalcedon, and those who failed to do so were threatened with removal from their monasteries. The majority of monks refused to accept the council, and thus Paul had the army led by Asclepius sent to dislocate the monks. The resulting violence led Emperor Justin to depose Paul in 521, who died shortly afterwards.

References

Bibliography

6th-century archbishops
Syrian archbishops
People of Roman Syria
6th-century Byzantine bishops
People from Constantinople
Greek Orthodox Patriarchs of Antioch
521 deaths